Niuatahi or also called Volcano O is a submarine volcano located in the far northern territory of Tonga. Since the cone in the middle is named Motutahi, the volcano is sometimes referred to as Niuatahi-Motutahi. Despite not having any record of any eruption, Niuatahi does have a record of recent hydrothermal activity.

Etymology
Niuatahi was named by the Tonga Ministry of Lands, Environment, Climate Change and Natural Resources. In the Tongan language, Niuatahi means sea. The name Motutahi means island in the sea in the Tongan language.

Geography

An active ridge can also be found just west of the caldera walls.

Structure
Niuatahi is a submarine volcano mostly known for its circular shape and enormous width. Along the floor of the caldera can also be found active hydrothermal systems.

Geologic setting

The Niuatahi underwater volcano is located in an area of complex tectonics. It is located in the Lau Back-Arc Basin, which consists of oceanic crust that separates the remnant Lau-Colville Ridge and the active Tofua volcanic arc from each other. The back-arc basin is mainly formed by the rollback of the Tonga Trench. The Lau Basin is host to many different geologic structures that are both typical and unique compared to other Pacific back-arc basins. A typical characteristic includes the basin being located above a well-defined Wadati-Benioff zone that points to the location of the subduction of the Cretaceous Pacific Plate lithosphere into the Tonga Trench under the Australian Plate. The Wadati-Benioff zone of the area reaches as deep as  under the North Fiji Basin.

More specifically, Niuatahi can be found in the northeastern part of the Lau Basin. Considering its unique tectonic setting, the NE Lau Basin hosts multiple types of submarine volcanism mostly composed by a subduction-related water-fluxed crust melting and crustal extension. Geochemically, the lavas from the NE Lau Basin vary from mid-ocean ridge basalt-like to arc-like lavas.

Petrology
The analysis of the lava rocks from the center of Niuatahi volcano revealed that the products were composed of aphyric to porphyritic with low-K dacite that consists of mostly glassy material. Meanwhile, in the southeastern part of the caldera, rock samples returned an olivine-bearing basalt composition, pointing to the products being mostly boninite which complies with past research in the area.

Activity

No historical eruptions have been recorded however Niuatahi has been hydrothermally active since its discovery.

Hydrothermal activity

On the caldera floor and rims of Niuatahi can be found many hydrothermal vents. In 2018, a bathymetric survey expedition was executed and many ROV dives were made in 3 sites around the caldera including the southwest, the south-central and the north of the caldera. In the southwest, venting with 293 °C with clear to gray smoke was observed at  depth. In the south-central area, clear to black smoke was observed at vents with temperatures of 334 °C at most at a depth similar to the southwest vents. All of these vent sites have a sulfide composition, hence the yellowish colors can be seen in some vent smokes.

See also
West Mata
List of volcanoes in Tonga

Notes

Sources

References

Volcanoes of Tonga
Submarine calderas